The Pennsylvania Legislative Black Caucus is an American political organization composed of African Americans elected to the Pennsylvania General Assembly.

Role
By drafting and sponsoring legislation to address constituent needs and by examining all bills that affect the black populace, the Caucus acts as a legislative body on behalf of the black community. The Caucus presents a black perspective from the entire state to the Legislature and advocates public policies that promote black social, cultural and economic progress, statewide. In addition, the Caucus serves as a research study group to generate pertinent data in support of appropriate public policies.

Current membership

Notes

Pennsylvania General Assembly
State Legislative Black Caucuses